Nathaniel Kleitman  (April 26, 1895 – August 13, 1999) was an American physiologist and sleep researcher who served as Professor Emeritus in Physiology at the University of Chicago. He is recognized as the father of modern sleep research, and is the author of the seminal 1939 book Sleep and Wakefulness.

Biography

Early life
Nathaniel Kleitman was born in Chișinău, also known as Kishinev, the capital of the province of Bessarabia (now Moldova), in 1895 to a Jewish family. He was deeply interested in consciousness and reasoned that he could get insight in consciousness by studying the unconsciousness of sleep. Pogroms drove him to Palestine, and in 1915 he emigrated to the United States as a result of World War I. At the age of twenty, he landed in New York City penniless; in 1923, at age twenty-eight, he had worked his way through City College of New York and earned a PhD from the University of Chicago's Department of Physiology. His thesis was "Studies on the physiology of sleep." Soon after, in 1925, he joined the faculty there. An early sponsor of Kleitman's sleep research was the Wander Company, which manufactured Ovaltine and hoped to promote it as a remedy for insomnia.

REM sleep
Eugene Aserinsky, one of Kleitman's graduate students, decided to hook sleepers up to an early version of an electroencephalogram machine, which scribbled across  of paper each night. In the process, Aserinsky noticed that several times each night the sleepers went through periods when their eyes darted wildly back and forth. Kleitman insisted that the experiment be repeated yet again, this time on his daughter, Esther. In 1953, he and Aserinsky introduced the world to "rapid-eye movement," or REM sleep. Kleitman and Aserinsky demonstrated that REM sleep was correlated with dreaming and brain activity. Another of Kleitman's graduate students, William C. Dement, who was a professor of psychiatry at the Stanford medical school, described this as the year that "the study of sleep became a true scientific field."

Rest activity cycle
Kleitman made countless additional contributions to the field of sleep research and was especially interested in "rest-activity" cycles, leading to many fundamental findings on circadian and ultradian rhythms. Kleitman proposed the existence of a Basic rest activity cycle, or BRAC, during both sleep and wakefulness.

Other experiments
Renowned for his personal and experimental rigor, he conducted well-known sleep studies underground in Mammoth Cave, Kentucky and lesser-known studies underwater in submarines during World War II and above the Arctic Circle.

See also

 Chronotype

References

External links
 Guide to the Nathaniel Kleitman Papers 1896-2001 at the University of Chicago Special Collections Research Center

1895 births
1999 deaths
Scientists from Chișinău
People from Kishinyovsky Uyezd
Moldovan Jews
Emigrants from the Russian Empire to the Ottoman Empire
Emigrants from the Russian Empire to the United States
American people of Moldovan-Jewish descent
American physiologists
Sleep researchers
American centenarians
Men centenarians
Chronobiologists
University of Chicago alumni
University of Chicago faculty
Jewish neuroscientists
American neuroscientists